Stella Matutina may refer to:
Stella Matutina, an initiatory order
Stella Matutina (Jesuit School), a Jesuit school